Aileen Despard was an actress, born on July 19, 1908 in Mullynure, County Armagh, Ireland. She died August 25, 1981 in Rushcliffe, Nottinghamshire, England, UK.

In 1930, the magazine Film Weekly sponsored a pair of film acting scholarships. The two winners (Cyril Butcher and Aileen Despard) went on to appear in the now lost Alfred Hitchcock short An Elastic Affair and placed under contract by British International Pictures.

Selected filmography
Double Dealing (1932) - Rosie
Threads (1932) - Chloe
Children of Chance (1930) - Beryl (as Eileen Despard)
Such Is the Law (1930) - Minor Role (uncredited)
Murder! (1930) - Edna Druce (uncredited)
An Elastic Affair (Short) (1930) - The Girl

References

External links
 Aileen Despard at IMDb

1908 births
1981 deaths